Charles Andrew Caldwell (January 6, 1920 – June 14, 2000) was a Canadian football coach who served as the head coach of the Ottawa Rough Riders in 1955. He played college football at Tennessee.

Early life and education
Chan Caldwell was born on January 6, 1920, in Knoxville, Tennessee. Caldwell played college football at Tennessee. He played two seasons of college football. In 1946, he had 4 catches for 37 yards. In 1947 he had four catches for 48 yards.

Coaching career

Ottawa Rough Riders
In 1955, he was the head coach of the Ottawa Rough Riders. He had a record of 3–9.

Death
Caldwell died on June 14, 2000 at the age of 80.

References

1920 births
2000 deaths
Tennessee Volunteers football players
Ottawa Rough Riders coaches
People from Knoxville, Tennessee
American expatriates in Canada